Lisa Roberts is a Canadian politician, who was elected to the Nova Scotia House of Assembly in a by-election on August 30, 2016. She represented the electoral district of Halifax Needham as a member of the Nova Scotia New Democratic Party until 2021.

She was re-elected in the 2017 provincial election.

Roberts announced in February 2021 that she would seek nomination as the NDP candidate for Halifax in the next federal election, but continue her role as MLA until either the next federal or provincial election, whichever came first. She represented the NDP in the 2021 federal election but finished second, behind Andy Fillmore of the Liberal Party.

Before entering politics, Roberts had been executive director of Veith House, and a journalist with CBC Radio’s Information Morning in Halifax. She has been involved in several Halifax community initiatives, like the community garden on Needham Hill.

Electoral record

Federal

Provincial

References

Nova Scotia New Democratic Party MLAs
Women MLAs in Nova Scotia
Living people
People from Halifax, Nova Scotia
21st-century Canadian politicians
21st-century Canadian women politicians
Year of birth missing (living people)
New Democratic Party candidates for the Canadian House of Commons
Nova Scotia candidates for Member of Parliament